Sokkate was a Burmese royal title.

It may mean:

 Sokkate:  King of Pagan (r. 1038−44)
 Sokkate of Toungoo:  Governor of Toungoo (r. 1379/80−83/84)
 Sokkate of Prome:  Governor of Prome (r. 1413)

Burmese royal titles